The Walters are an American indie pop band formed in 2014, from Chicago, Illinois, composed of lead vocalist Luke Olson, lead guitarist Walter Kosner, rhythm guitarist/vocalist MJ Tirabassi, bassist Danny Wells, and drummer Charlie Ekhaus. They have released three EPs and had their first national tour in 2017.

History 
The Walters formed in Chicago, Illinois in 2014 after the band's guitarist and namesake Walter Kosner moved from Connecticut to Chicago to attend DePaul University. After dropping out of the school, Kosner recruited the rest of the band members who eventually would form The Walters. That same year, the band released their first recorded effort, Songs for Dads. The release saw the band charting on Spotify's United States Viral Top 50 which caught the attention of Canvasback Records. As part of the label's ongoing monthly singles series, Canvasclub, The Walters released two songs, entitled "Hunk Beach" and "I Want to Be Good".

In 2015, the band also recorded and independently released their second EP, Young Men. This was followed in 2017 by the single "She's Gonna Leave You". In 2017, the band began their first national tour and also performed at the Lollapalooza music festival. On September 23, the band announced via their Facebook page that they "currently had no future plans to release new music as The Walters".

Following the band's breakup, lead vocalist Luke Olson started a solo career under the moniker "L. Martin", while the remaining members formed a new band called Corduroy. In an April 2021 interview, Olson stated that "the band broke up with [him]" and that it was "a pretty tough pill to swallow." Olson later attributed the breakup to the band being burnt out and overwhelmed by their success at a young age, while rhythm guitarist MJ Tirabassi attributed the breakup to being unrecognized by the music industry.

In late 2021, their song "I Love You So" from the EP Songs for Dads went viral on TikTok, leading to the song earning nearly 4 million on-demand streams in the United States in the first week of November. On November 3, 2021, the band announced their reunion alongside a three-show tour running through December and subsequently signed with Warner Records. In an interview with Variety, Olson said that the band had been "flirting with the idea of reuniting" and that the success of "I Love You So" led to them officially reuniting. The sleeper hit went on to chart throughout 2021 and 2022 in 4 countries and other global charts, with the band also performing the song on Jimmy Kimmel Live! on January 28, 2022.

On April 14, 2022, the band released a new single, "Million Little Problems", their first original output since 2017. The single was accompanied by the announcement of their upcoming EP, Try Again, which was released May 6.

Members 
 Luke Olson – lead vocals, guitar (2014–2017, 2021–present)
 Walter Kosner – lead guitar (2014–2017, 2021–present)
 MJ Tirabassi – rhythm guitar, vocals (2014–2017, 2021–present)
 Danny Wells – bass (2014–2017, 2021–present)
 Charlie Ekhaus – drums (2014–2017, 2021–present)

Touring members
 Luke Otwell – guitar, keyboards, backing vocals (2021–present)
 Kris Hansen – keyboards, trumpet, backing vocals (2021–present)

Discography

Extended plays

Singles

References 

Musical groups established in 2014
Musical groups from Chicago
Alternative rock groups from Chicago
2014 establishments in Illinois